Monos is an island in the Republic of Trinidad and Tobago. It is one of the "Bocas Islands", which lie in the Bocas del Dragón (Dragons' Mouth) between Trinidad and Venezuela. It is so named as the island was once home to noisy red howler monkeys ("monos" being the Spanish term for monkeys).

See also
 List of islands of Trinidad and Tobago

References
 

Islands of Trinidad and Tobago
Gulf of Paria